"100 in a 55" is a song by rock band Pop Evil.  The song is the second single from the band from Lipstick on the Mirror, the debut studio album from the band.

Premise 
According to Pop Evil lead vocalist Leigh Kakty, the song is similar to recuperation, as it is about focusing on what is optimal for an individual and those close to them.  It is about holding one's ground, and asking one's self whether or not they would like to be someone important in the international community.  Kakaty goes on to state that the composition touches on viewing one's reflection and combating the demon that one created.

Chart performance

Certifications

References 

Pop Evil songs
2008 singles
2008 songs